Wonky (also known as purple sound or aquacrunk) is a subgenre of electronic music known primarily for its off-kilter or “unstable” beats, as well as its eclectic, colorful blend of genres including hip-hop, electro-funk, 8-bit, jazz fusion, glitch, and crunk. Artists associated with the style include Joker, Rustie, Hudson Mohawke, Zomby, and Flying Lotus.

History
Wonky initially emerged in 2008 as a colorful, exuberant style drawing on hip hop, synth-funk, glitchy electronica, and more eclectic influences, in contrast with the austere sound of the UK's ongoing dubstep and grime scenes.  Other influences included American hip hop producers J Dilla and Madlib, with some artists drawing more explicitly on an instrumental hip-hop sound rather than dubstep. The term "wonky" has been rejected by various artists associated with the style.

Characteristics
Wonky is known for its off-kilter rhythms and typically features garish synthesizer tones, melodies, and effects. The "unstable" sound of wonky is often achieved by producing unquantised beats, abandoning the metronomic precision of much electronic music. Artists also use heavy sub-bass, which has been attributed to synergistic effects of bass with the drug ketamine, which became popular in UK clubs during the dubstep era. BBC Music called it a style of "slightly out-of-phase beats and synthesisers that wobble woozily, like they’ve warped after being left out in the sun."

Purple sound emerged in Bristol in late 2008 out of the splintering dubstep scene and took inspiration from wonky, which it is sometimes considered a part of. It incorporates synth-funk from the 1980s and G-funk production from the ’90s into dubstep, while also introducing many aspects of grime and 8-bit music (several prominent purple sound artists cite video game music as a large influence).

See also
Dubstep
Future bass

References

Electronic music genres
English styles of music